The 1968–69 Romanian Hockey League season was the 39th season of the Romanian Hockey League. Five teams participated in the league, and Steaua Bucuresti won the championship.

Regular season

External links
hochei.net

Rom
Romanian Hockey League seasons
1968–69 in Romanian ice hockey